Luis Alberto Luna Tobar O.C.D., (December 15, 1923 – February 7, 2017) was an Ecuadorian prelate of the Roman Catholic Church.

Was born in Quito, Ecuador, and was ordained a priest on June 23, 1946, from the Catholic religious order of the Order of Discalced Carmelites. 

Was appointed auxiliary archbishop of Archdiocese of Quito as well as titular bishop of Mulli on August 17, 1977, and was ordained bishop on September 18, 1977, by Cardinal Pablo Muñoz Vega. 

Was appointed archbishop of Vicar Apostolic of Cuenca on May 7, 1981, and served until his retirement on February 15, 2000. 

He died on February 7, 2017.

References

External links
Catholic-Hierarchy
"Ecuador Ama la Vida"

1923 births
2017 deaths
People from Quito
20th-century Roman Catholic archbishops in Ecuador
Discalced Carmelite bishops
Roman Catholic bishops of Quito